Micheal Ozor (born 13 January 1988) is a Nigerian footballer. He currently plays for FC Kiffen.

Career
Ozor previously played for the Youth Star Sporting Club in Nigeria. In 2006, he signed a contract with the Finnish first division team Atlantis FC. In mid-season 2007, he was loaned from Atlantis FC to SoVo till the end of season.

In January 2008, Ozor was on trial with Bonner SC, but played with OLS during the 2008 season. In December of that year, he was practising with AC Oulu before going to Berlin for a test game with Hertha BSC. He left in January 2009 his club AC Oulu to play the season 2009 with EIF. After one season for Ekenäs Idrottsförening announced in late April 2010 his return to Atlantis FC.

References

1988 births
Living people
Atlantis FC players
Nigerian footballers
Association football midfielders
Nigerian expatriate sportspeople in Finland
Sportspeople from Lagos
Nigerian expatriate footballers
Expatriate footballers in Finland
Ekenäs IF players
FC Kiffen 08 players
Oulun Luistinseura players